John Sigsbee Pindar (November 18, 1835 – June 30, 1907) was an American lawyer and politician who served two non-consecutive terms as a U.S. Representative from New York from 1885 to 1887, then again briefly from late 1890 to early 1891.

Biography 
Born in Sharon, New York, Pindar attended the common schools and Richmondville Seminary.
He studied law.
He was admitted to the bar in 1865.

He served as president of the village of Cobleskill 1882-1884.
He served as chairman of the Democratic county committee for ten years.

Congress 
Pindar was elected as a Democrat to the Forty-ninth Congress (March 4, 1885 – March 3, 1887).

Career in between terms 
He served as delegate to the Democratic National Convention in 1888.
He resumed the practice of law in Cobleskill, New York.
He was an unsuccessful candidate in 1888 for election to the Fifty-first Congress.

Return to Congress 
Pindar was subsequently elected to the Fifty-first Congress to fill the vacancy caused by the death of David Wilber and served from November 4, 1890, to March 3, 1891.

Later career and death 
He resumed the practice of law.
He died in Cobleskill, New York, June 30, 1907.
He was interred in Cobleskill Cemetery.

Sources

1835 births
1907 deaths
Democratic Party members of the United States House of Representatives from New York (state)
People from Sharon, New York
People from Cobleskill, New York
19th-century American politicians